Rossdale is a surname. Notable people with the surname include:

 Albert B. Rossdale (1878–1968), American politician
 David Rossdale (born 1953), British bishop
 Gavin Rossdale (born 1965), English singer, songwriter, musician, and actor

See also
 Rossdale, Edmonton